2XL TrophyLite Rally is a racing video game developed by American studio 2XL Games and released on June 10, 2010, for iOS.

Critical reception
The game has a Metacritic score of 71% based on 5 critic reviews. Pocket Gamer described the game as "The Desert Megan Fox, 2XL TrophyLite Rally looks beautiful, handles well, but lacks variation, challenge, and depth." Gamezebo said: "A brilliantly constructed racer that’s missing its heart."

References

2010 video games
IOS games
Rally racing video games
Video games developed in the United States